HMS A10 was an  submarine built for the Royal Navy in the first decade of the 20th century. After surviving World War I, she was sold for scrap in 1919.

Design and description
A10 was a member of the first British class of submarines, although slightly larger, faster and more heavily armed than the lead ship, . They displaced  on the surface and  submerged. The A-class submarines had a crew of 2 officers and 9 ratings.

For surface running, the boats were powered by a single 16-cylinder  Wolseley petrol engine that drove one propeller shaft. When submerged the propeller was driven by a  electric motor. They could reach  on the surface and  underwater.

The boats were armed with two 18-inch (45 cm) torpedo tubes in the bow. They could carry a pair of reload torpedoes, but generally did not as their weight had to be compensated for by an equivalent weight of fuel.

Construction and career
A10 was ordered as part of the 1903–04 Naval Programme from Vickers. She was laid down at their shipyard in Barrow-in-Furness in 1903, launched on 8 February 1905 and completed on 3 June 1905. She collided with the battleship  in Plymouth Sound on 30 April 1906.

A10 was sold for scrap to the Ardrossan Drydock Company of Ardrossan, Scotland, on 1 April 1919 .

Notes

References

External links
MaritimeQuest HMS A-10 Pages
'Submarine losses 1904 to present day' - Royal Navy Submarine Museum

 

A-class submarines (1903)
World War I submarines of the United Kingdom
Ships built in Barrow-in-Furness
Royal Navy ship names
1905 ships
Maritime incidents in 1906